Elophos is a genus of moths in the family Geometridae.

Species
 Elophos andereggaria (La Harpe, 1853)
 Elophos barbarica Prout, 1915
 Elophos caelibaria (Heydenreich, 1851)
 Elophos dilucidaria (Denis & Schiffermüller, 1775)
 Elophos dognini (Thierry-Mieg, 1910)
 Elophos operaria (Hübner, 1813)
 Elophos serotinaria (Denis & Schiffermüller, 1775)
 Elophos sproengertsi (Püngeler, 1914)
 Elophos unicoloraria (Staudinger, 1871)
 Elophos vittaria (Thunberg, 1788)
 Elophos zelleraria (Freyer, 1836)
 Elophos zirbitzensis (Pieszcek, 1902)

References
 Elophos at Markku Savela's Lepidoptera and Some Other Life Forms
 Natural History Museum Lepidoptera genus database

Gnophini